The LDS edition of the Bible is a version of the Bible published by the Church of Jesus Christ of Latter-day Saints (LDS Church) in English, Spanish, and Portuguese. The text of the LDS Church's English-language Bible is the King James Version, its Spanish-language Bible is a revised Reina-Valera translation, and its Portuguese-language edition is based on the Almeida translation. The editions include footnoting, indexing, and summaries that are consistent with the doctrines of the LDS Church and that integrate the Bible with the church's other canonized Latter-day Saint scriptures. The LDS Church encourages its members to use the LDS Church edition of the Bible.

English-language King James Version edition

The LDS Church published its first edition of the Bible in English in 1979.  The text of the Bible is that of the Authorized King James Version. Both the Old and New Testaments are included, but the Apocrypha is not. Each chapter includes a succinct heading, typically a descriptive summary, though some serve as commentaries. Cross-referencing footnotes to the Bible, the Book of Mormon, the Doctrine and Covenants, and the Pearl of Great Price are included, as is a 600-page topical index and the Bible Dictionary, an adaptation of the Cambridge Bible Dictionary. Selected references to the Joseph Smith Translation of the Bible are included in footnotes, with longer excerpts included in an appendix. Lastly, the edition contains bible maps and a gazetteer. In 1999, the church added color photographs from the Holy Land. The supplements in the edition do not claim doctrinal authority—the institutional church regards only the scriptural text of the King James Version (and its other standard works) as canonical—"though this fact is not particularly prominent in the minds of Church members" who have historically tended to consider the supplements normative.

Thomas S. Monson, a church apostle at the time who later became church president, headed the Scriptures Publications Committee which oversaw the publication of the church's English-language edition of the Bible. The committee included Bruce R. McConkie and Boyd K. Packer, also apostles, and briefly also included apostles Howard W. Hunter and Marvin J. Ashton. For technical assistance, the committee called on outside assistance, including at one point "at least one hundred faculty and students at Brigham Young University" (BYU) as Robert J. Matthews, a former dean of Religious Education at BYU who was among the committee's assistants, reports.

The English-language edition's supplements promulgates "strongly conservative" theological positions largely reflecting McConkie's views. McConkie wrote all the chapter headings, and he was an associate of Matthews, who was the chief compiler of the adapted Bible Dictionary.

In 1992, the church's First Presidency announced the King James Version was the church's official English Bible, stating, "[w]hile other Bible versions may be easier to read than the King James Version, in doctrinal matters latter-day revelation supports the King James Version in preference to other English translations." In 2010, the church added this statement to its Handbook, which directs official church policy and programs.

Spanish-language Reina-Valera edition
In 2009, the LDS Church published a Spanish-language edition of the Bible. Entitled Santa Biblia: Reina-Valera 2009, the text of the Bible is based on the 1909 version of the Reina-Valera translation. Changes to the text included modernization of grammar and vocabulary. Like the English-language edition, the Spanish-language edition includes LDS-oriented footnotes and chapter headings, as well as a topical index. The church's Spanish-language Bible project was supervised by general authorities Jay E. Jensen and Lynn A. Mickelsen.

Portuguese-language Almeida edition
In 2015, the LDS Church released a new Portuguese-language edition of the Bible, a revision of the edited and corrected 1914 edition of João Ferreira de Almeida's translation. This version was initially released electronically, and it became available in print in March 2016.

Other languages
As of 2015, the LDS Church does not publish Bibles in any other languages besides English, Spanish and Portuguese. However, as stated in the General Handbook, "[i]n many other non-English languages, the Church has approved a non–Latter-day Saint edition of the Bible for use in Church meetings and classes."

See also 

Bible videos

Notes

References

Further reading

External links
English-language edition
English-language LDS Church Bible: complete text in PDF, including footnotes and chapter headings. Does not include other supplemental material.
English-language Old Testament: complete text in HTML, including footnotes and chapter headings
English-language New Testament: complete text in HTML, including footnotes and chapter headings
English-language Study Helps: complete text in HTML of the topical index, bible dictionary, maps, and Joseph Smith Translation

Spanish-language edition
Spanish-language LDS Church Bible: complete text in PDF, including footnotes and chapter headings.
Official webpage of Spanish-language edition
Spanish-language Old Testament: complete text in HTML, including footnotes and chapter headings
Spanish-language New Testament: complete text in HTML, including footnotes and chapter headings

Portuguese-language edition
Portuguese-language LDS Church Bible: complete text in PDF, including footnotes and chapter headings.
Official webpage of Portuguese-language edition
Portuguese-language Old Testament: complete text in HTML, including footnotes and chapter headings
Portuguese-language New Testament: complete text in HTML, including footnotes and chapter headings

Other media
 "That Promised Day: The Coming Forth of the LDS Scriptures" - BYUtv documentary describing the production of the modern (1979+) English editions of the Standard Works, starting with the LDS edition of the Bible.

1979 books
2009 non-fiction books
King James Version editions
Bible versions and translations
Standard works
Study Bibles
Bible
2009 in Christianity
1979 in Christianity
Bible translations into Spanish
Bible translations into Portuguese
Bible translations into English
2015 books
2015 in Christianity
Mormonism and the Bible